Kefauver Place is a historic farm complex located at Rohrersville, Washington County, Maryland, United States. It includes a log cabin built about 1820; a log barn of about 1830 with later-19th-century additions; a 19th-century timber-framed corn crib; a two-story brick house constructed around 1880; an early-20th-century masonry root cellar; and a frame summer kitchen, hog pen, chicken house, and garage all dating from about 1930. Also on the property are two fieldstone spring enclosures.  It is located on a  property.

Kefauver Place was listed on the National Register of Historic Places in 2005.

References

External links
, including photo from 2002, at Maryland Historical Trust

Farms on the National Register of Historic Places in Maryland
Houses in Washington County, Maryland
Federal architecture in Maryland
National Register of Historic Places in Washington County, Maryland